Catalonia uses certain conventions for presenting dates and times.

Date
In Catalonia the date order is day, month, year. In most situations, the grammar and syntax rules are applied to this format: <Weekday>, <monthday> / <Month> / <year>.

Note that months are not capitalized.

Two-digit years are used for short mainly informally where no confusion arises, as in handwriting letters, notes and diaries. Official documents always use full four-digit years.

Week 
The week starts on Monday and ends on Sunday. In short form, days can be written as follows: 
  for dilluns (Monday)
  for dimarts (Tuesday)
  for dimecres (Wednesday)
  for dijous (Thursday)
  for divendres (Friday)
  for dissabte (Saturday)
  (also dium) for diumenge (Sunday).

Months
 Gener (January)
 Febrer (February)
 Març (March)
 Abril (April)
 Maig (May)
 Juny (June)
 Juliol (July)
 Agost (August)
 Setembre (September)
 Octubre (October)
 Novembre (November)
 Desembre (December)

Time

In Catalonia there are three spoken word time systems: traditional, modern and a mixture of both. It depends greatly on each Catalan variant.

The traditional uses the quarters as a unit reference based on analog clocks, while the modern one is based on digital clocks.

The two main variants of the 12-hour clock used in spoken Catalan are regarding quarterly fractions and half quarters of the current hour, in a similar way to the quarter's bells of the Big Ben and many others classical tower clocks (except for the four quarters of the full hours). One always relates to the next full hour, in other words, it names the fraction of the currently passing hour. For example, ""tres quarts de tres" ("three-quarters of three", see table below) stands for "three quarters of the third hour have passed". The other variant is relative; this one is also used for multiples of five minutes.

Note that these phrases are exclusive to the 12-hour clock, just as the "(hour) (minutes)" format is exclusive to the 24-hour clock.

References

Time in Spain
Catalonia
Communications in Catalonia